Giovanni Lattuada (January 12, 1905 – April 16, 1984) was an Italian artistic gymnast who competed in the 1932 Summer Olympics. He was born in Caronno Pertusella. In 1932 he won the bronze medal in the rings competition. He also participated in the horizontal bar event and finished twelfth.

External links
 

1905 births
1984 deaths
Italian male artistic gymnasts
Olympic gymnasts of Italy
Gymnasts at the 1932 Summer Olympics
Olympic bronze medalists for Italy
Olympic medalists in gymnastics
Medalists at the 1932 Summer Olympics
People from Caronno Pertusella